The Bank of Taiwan (BOT, see below) is a commercial bank headquartered in Taipei, Taiwan. It is owned by the government of Taiwan.

History

The Bank of Taiwan was established as Taiwan's central bank in 1899, during Japanese rule.  The bank's creation was authorized in 1897 by the Bank Act of Taiwan which encouraged Japanese enterprises, such as the Mitsubishi and Mitsui Groups, to invest in Taiwan. Extensive cooperation ensued between the Nippon Kangyo Bank and the Bank of Taiwan. A financial crisis facing these banks in 1927 was relieved with assistance from the Bank of Japan. Bank branches were created in other parts of Asia as the Japanese empire expanded, including areas in China and Southeast Asia.

After the Japanese surrender in 1945, the ROC government (led by the Chinese Nationalist Party, or KMT) took over the Bank of Taiwan and began issuing Taiwan dollars, also known as Taiwan Nationalist Yuan, through the Bank of Taiwan. This currency is now referred to as the "old Taiwan dollar." Severe inflation of this currency during the Chinese Civil War led the Bank of Taiwan to issue the New Taiwan dollar in 1949. After the loss of mainland China in the Chinese Civil War by the KMT and its subsequent retreat to Taiwan, the Bank of Taiwan took on a more central role as the central bank of the ROC until the Central Bank of China was reestablished in 1961. The Bank of Taiwan was governed under the Taiwan Provincial Government until 1998 when governance was transferred to the ROC Finance Ministry. In 2001 the Central Bank of China took over the task of issuing the New Taiwan Dollar.

The Bank of Taiwan currently operates a total of 169 domestic branches as well as branches in Tokyo, Singapore, Hong Kong and the People's Republic of China. Branches have also been established in New York City, Los Angeles, London, and South Africa.

In July 2007, the Bank of Taiwan merged with the Central Trust as part of a government financial reform package. The bank continues to operate as an independent company taking over some aspects of the Trust's banking business. In January 2008, the Bank became part of the Taiwan Financial Holdings Group, which also contains BankTaiwan Securities and BankTaiwan Life Insurance.

Corporate Structure

The Bank of Taiwan currently consists of the following departments of businesses:
 Department of Planning
 Department of Circulation
 Department of Business
 Department of Risk Management
 Department of Corporate Finance
 Department of Public Treasury
 Department of Consumer Finance
 Department of International Banking
 Department of Treasury
 Department of Trusts
 Department of Electronic Banking
 Department of Wealth Management
 Department of Credit Management
 Department of Government Employee Insurance
 Department of Real Estate Management
 Department of Procurement
 Department of Domestic Operations
 Department of Load Assets Management
 Department of Credit Analysis
 Department of Precious Metals
 Department of Accounting
 Department of Legal Affairs
 Department of Human Resources
 Department of Information Management
 Department of General Affairs
 Department of Economic Research
 Department of Ethics
 Secretariat

See also

 The Bank of Taiwan Building in the Bund, Shanghai.
 Economy of Taiwan
 List of banks in Taiwan
 List of companies of Taiwan
 Old Taiwan dollar
 Taiwanese yen

References

External links
The Bank of Taiwan Official Website  
Banknotes issued under Japanese authorities

Banks of Taiwan
Banks established in 1897
Companies based in Taipei
1897 establishments in Taiwan
Government-owned companies of Taiwan